Rigny-sur-Arroux (literally Rigny on Arroux) is a commune in the east-central French department of Saône-et-Loire, Bourgogne-Franche-Comté.

The discovery in 1874 of a cache of Solutrean laurel-leaf flint points in the hamlet of Volgu, just south of the village proper, indicates that the environs of the present-day Rigny were inhabited or frequented by Paleolithic peoples around 20,000 years ago.

See also
Communes of the Saône-et-Loire department

References

Communes of Saône-et-Loire